The Arctic ( or ) is a polar region located at the northernmost part of Earth. The Arctic consists of the Arctic Ocean, adjacent seas, and parts of Canada (Yukon, Northwest Territories, Nunavut), Danish Realm (Greenland), northern Finland (Lapland), Iceland, northern Norway (Finnmark and Svalbard), Russia (Murmansk, Siberia, Nenets Okrug, Novaya Zemlya), northernmost Sweden and the United States (Alaska). Land within the Arctic region has seasonally varying snow and ice cover, with predominantly treeless permafrost (permanently frozen underground ice) containing tundra. Arctic seas contain seasonal sea ice in many places.

The Arctic region is a unique area among Earth's ecosystems. The cultures in the region and the Arctic indigenous peoples have adapted to its cold and extreme conditions. Life in the Arctic includes zooplankton and phytoplankton, fish and marine mammals, birds, land animals, plants and human societies. Arctic land is bordered by the subarctic.

Definition and etymology 
The word Arctic comes from the Greek word  (arktikos), "near the Bear, northern" and from the word  (arktos), meaning bear. The name refers either to the constellation Ursa Major, the "Great Bear", which is prominent in the northern portion of the celestial sphere, or to the constellation Ursa Minor, the "Little Bear", which contains the celestial north pole (currently very near Polaris, the current north Pole Star, or North Star).

There are a number of definitions of what area is contained within the Arctic. The area can be defined as north of the Arctic Circle (about 66° 34'N), the approximate southern limit of the midnight sun and the polar night. Another definition of the Arctic, which is popular with ecologists, is the region in the Northern Hemisphere where the average temperature for the warmest month (July) is below ; the northernmost tree line roughly follows the isotherm at the boundary of this region.

Climate 

The Arctic is characterized by cold winters and cool summers. High winds often stir up snow, creating the illusion of continuous snowfall. Coastal Arctic climates are moderated by oceanic influences, having generally warmer temperatures and heavier snowfalls than the colder and drier interior areas. The Arctic is affected by current global warming, leading to Arctic sea ice shrinkage, diminished ice in the Greenland ice sheet, and Arctic methane release as the permafrost thaws. The melting of Greenland's ice sheet is linked to polar amplification.

Perhaps the most alarming result of this is Arctic sea ice shrinkage. There is a large variance in predictions of Arctic sea ice loss, with models showing near-complete to complete loss in September from 2035 to some time around 2067.

Flora and fauna 
Arctic life is characterized by adaptation to short growing seasons with long periods of sunlight, and cold, dark, snow-covered winter conditions.

Plants 

Arctic vegetation is composed of plants such as dwarf shrubs, graminoids, herbs, lichens, and mosses, which all grow relatively close to the ground, forming tundra. An example of a dwarf shrub is the bearberry. As one moves northward, the amount of warmth available for plant growth decreases considerably. In the northernmost areas, plants are at their metabolic limits, and small differences in the total amount of summer warmth make large differences in the amount of energy available for maintenance, growth and reproduction. Colder summer temperatures cause the size, abundance, productivity and variety of plants to decrease. Trees cannot grow in the Arctic, but in its warmest parts, shrubs are common and can reach  in height; sedges, mosses and lichens can form thick layers. In the coldest parts of the Arctic, much of the ground is bare; non-vascular plants such as lichens and mosses predominate, along with a few scattered grasses and forbs (like the Arctic poppy).

Animals 

Herbivores on the tundra include the Arctic hare, lemming, muskox, and caribou. They are preyed on by the snowy owl, Arctic fox, Grizzly bear, and Arctic wolf. The polar bear is also a predator, though it prefers to hunt for marine life from the ice. There are also many birds and marine species endemic to the colder regions. Other terrestrial animals include wolverines, moose, Dall sheep, ermines, and Arctic ground squirrels. Marine mammals include seals, walrus, and several species of cetacean—baleen whales and also narwhals, orcas, and belugas. An excellent and famous example of a ring species exists and has been described around the Arctic Circle in the form of the Larus gulls.

Natural resources 

The Arctic includes copious natural resources (oil, gas, minerals, fresh water, fish and, if the subarctic is included, forest) to which modern technology and the economic opening up of Russia have given significant new opportunities. The interest of the tourism industry is also on the increase.

The Arctic contains some of the last and most extensive continuous wilderness areas in the world, and its significance in preserving biodiversity and genotypes is considerable. The increasing presence of humans fragments vital habitats. The Arctic is particularly susceptible to the abrasion of groundcover and to the disturbance of the rare breeding grounds of the animals that are characteristic to the region. The Arctic also holds 1/5 of the Earth's water supply.

Paleontology

During the Cretaceous time period, the Arctic still had seasonal snows, though only a light dusting and not enough to permanently hinder plant growth. Animals such as the Chasmosaurus, Hypacrosaurus, Troodon, and Edmontosaurus may have all migrated north to take advantage of the summer growing season, and migrated south to warmer climes when winter came. A similar situation may also have been found amongst dinosaurs that lived in Antarctic regions, such as the Muttaburrasaurus of Australia.

However, others claim that dinosaurs lived year-round at very high latitudes, such as near the Colville River, which is now at about 70° N but at the time (70 million years ago) was 10° further north.

Indigenous population 

The earliest inhabitants of North America's central and eastern Arctic are referred to as the Arctic small tool tradition (AST) and existed c. 2500 BCE. AST consisted of several Paleo-Eskimo cultures, including the Independence cultures and Pre-Dorset culture. The Dorset culture (Inuktitut: Tuniit or Tunit) refers to the next inhabitants of central and eastern Arctic. The Dorset culture evolved because of technological and economic changes during the period of 1050–550 BCE. With the exception of the Quebec/Labrador peninsula, the Dorset culture vanished around 1500 CE. Supported by genetic testing, evidence shows that descendants of the Dorset culture, known as the Sadlermiut, survived in Aivilik, Southampton and Coats Islands, until the beginning of the 20th century.

The Dorset/Thule culture transition dates around the ninth–10th centuries CE. Scientists theorize that there may have been cross-contact of the two cultures with sharing of technology, such as fashioning harpoon heads, or the Thule may have found Dorset remnants and adapted their ways with the predecessor culture. Others believe the Thule displaced the Dorset.

By 1300 CE, the Inuit, present-day Arctic inhabitants and descendants of Thule culture, had settled in west Greenland, and moved into east Greenland over the following century (Inughuit, Kalaallit and Tunumiit are modern Greenlandic Inuit groups descended from Thule). Over time, the Inuit have migrated throughout the Arctic regions of Eastern Russia, the United States, Canada, and Greenland.

Other Circumpolar North indigenous peoples include the Chukchi, Evenks, Iñupiat, Khanty, Koryaks, Nenets, Sami, Yukaghir, Gwich'in, and Yupik.

International cooperation and politics 

The eight Arctic nations (Canada, Kingdom of Denmark [Greenland & The Faroe Islands], Finland, Iceland, Norway, Sweden, Russia, and USA) are all members of the Arctic Council, as are organizations representing six indigenous populations. The council operates on consensus basis, mostly dealing with environmental treaties and not addressing boundary or resource disputes.

Though Arctic policy priorities differ, every Arctic nation is concerned about sovereignty/defense, resource development, shipping routes, and environmental protection. Much work remains on regulatory agreements regarding shipping, tourism, and resource development in Arctic waters. Arctic shipping is subject to some regulatory control through the International Code for Ships Operating in Polar Waters, adopted by the International Maritime Organization on 1 January 2017 and applies to all ships in Arctic waters over 500 tonnes.

Research in the Arctic has long been a collaborative international effort, evidenced by the International Polar Year. The International Arctic Science Committee, hundreds of scientists and specialists of the Arctic Council, and the Barents Euro-Arctic Council are more examples of collaborative international Arctic research.

Territorial claims 

No country owns the geographic North Pole or the region of the Arctic Ocean surrounding it. The surrounding six Arctic states that border the Arctic Ocean—Canada, Kingdom of Denmark (with Greenland), Iceland, Norway, Russia, and the United States—are limited to a  exclusive economic zone (EEZ) off their coasts. Two Arctic states (Finland and Sweden) do not have direct access to the Arctic Ocean.

Upon ratification of the United Nations Convention on the Law of the Sea, a country has ten years to make claims to an extended continental shelf beyond its 200 nautical mile zone. Due to this, Norway (which ratified the convention in 1996), Russia (ratified in 1997), Canada (ratified in 2003) and the Kingdom of Denmark (ratified in 2004) launched projects to establish claims that certain sectors of the Arctic seabed should belong to their territories.

On 2 August 2007, two Russian bathyscaphes, MIR-1 and MIR-2, for the first time in history descended to the Arctic seabed beneath the North Pole and placed there a Russian flag made of rust-proof titanium alloy. The flag-placing during Arktika 2007 generated commentary on and concern for a race for control of the Arctic's vast hydrocarbon resources.

Foreign ministers and other officials representing Canada, the Kingdom of Denmark, Norway, Russia, and the United States met in Ilulissat, Greenland on 28 May 2008 at the Arctic Ocean Conference and announced the Ilulissat Declaration, blocking any "new comprehensive international legal regime to govern the Arctic Ocean," and pledging "the orderly settlement of any possible overlapping claims."

As of 2012, the Kingdom of Denmark is claiming the continental shelf based on the Lomonosov Ridge between Greenland and over the North Pole to the northern limit of the Russian EEZ.

The Russian Federation is also claiming a large swath of seabed along the Lomonosov Ridge but, unlike Denmark, confined its claim to its side of the Arctic. In August 2015, Russia made a supplementary submission for the expansion of the external borders of its continental shelf in the Arctic Ocean, asserting that the eastern part of the Lomonosov Ridge and the Mendeleyev Ridge are an extension of the Eurasian continent. In August 2016, the UN Commission on the Limits of the Continental Shelf began to consider Russia's submission.

Canada claims the Northwest Passage as part of its internal waters belonging to Canada, while the United States and most maritime nations regards it as an international strait, which means that foreign vessels have right of transit passage.

Exploration 

Since 1937, the larger portion of the Asian-side Arctic region has been extensively explored by Soviet and Russian crewed drifting ice stations. Between 1937 and 1991, 88 international polar crews established and occupied scientific settlements on the drift ice and were carried thousands of kilometres by the ice flow.

Pollution 

The Arctic is comparatively clean, although there are certain ecologically difficult localized pollution problems that present a serious threat to people's health living around these pollution sources. Due to the prevailing worldwide sea and air currents, the Arctic area is the fallout region for long-range transport pollutants, and in some places the concentrations exceed the levels of densely populated urban areas. An example of this is the phenomenon of Arctic haze, which is commonly blamed on long-range pollutants. Another example is with the bioaccumulation of PCB's (polychlorinated biphenyls) in Arctic wildlife and people.

Preservation 

There have been many proposals to preserve the Arctic over the years. Most recently a group of stars at the Rio Earth Summit, on 21 June 2012, proposed protecting the Arctic, similar to the Antarctic protection. The initial focus of the campaign will be a UN resolution creating a global sanctuary around the pole, and a ban on oil drilling and unsustainable fishing in the Arctic.

The Arctic has climate change rates that are amongst the highest in the world. Due to the major impacts to the region from climate change the near climate future of the region will be extremely different under all scenarios of warming.

Global warming 

The effects of global warming in the Arctic include rising temperatures, loss of sea ice, and melting of the Greenland ice sheet. Potential methane release from the region, especially through the thawing of permafrost and methane clathrates, is also a concern. Because of the amplified response of the Arctic to global warming, it is often seen as a leading indicator of global warming. The melting of Greenland's ice sheet is linked to polar amplification.

The Arctic is especially vulnerable to the effects of any climate change, as has become apparent with the reduction of sea ice in recent years. Climate models predict much greater warming in the Arctic than the global average, resulting in significant international attention to the region. In particular, there are concerns that Arctic shrinkage, a consequence of melting glaciers and other ice in Greenland, could soon contribute to a substantial rise in sea levels worldwide.

The current Arctic warming is leading to ancient carbon being released from thawing permafrost, leading to methane and carbon dioxide production by micro-organisms. Release of methane and carbon dioxide stored in permafrost could cause abrupt and severe global warming, as they are potent greenhouse gases.

Climate change is also predicted to have a large impact on tundra vegetation, causing an increase of shrubs, and having a negative impact on bryophytes and lichens.

Apart from concerns regarding the detrimental effects of warming in the Arctic, some potential opportunities have gained attention. The melting of the ice is making the Northwest Passage, the shipping routes through the northernmost latitudes, more navigable, raising the possibility that the Arctic region will become a prime trade route. One harbinger of the opening navigability of the Arctic took place in the summer of 2016 when the Crystal Serenity successfully navigated the Northwest Passage, a first for a large cruise ship. 

In addition, it is believed that the Arctic seabed may contain substantial oil fields which may become accessible if the ice covering them melts. These factors have led to recent international debates as to which nations can claim sovereignty or ownership over the waters of the Arctic.

Arctic waters 

 Arctic Ocean
 Baffin Bay
 Beaufort Sea
 Barents Sea
 Bering Sea
 Bering Strait
 Chukchi Sea
 Davis Strait
 Denmark Strait
 East Siberian Sea
 Greenland Sea
 Hudson Bay
 Kara Sea
 Laptev Sea
 Nares Strait
 Norwegian Sea

Arctic lands

See also

 Arctic Search and Rescue Agreement
 List of countries by northernmost point
 Arctic sanctuary
 Poverty in the Arctic
 Arctic Winter Games
 Winter City

Notes

References

Bibliography

Further reading 
 Brian W. Coad, James D. Reist. (2017). Marine Fishes of Arctic Canada. University of Toronto Press. 
 "Global Security, Climate Change, and the Arctic"  – 24-page special journal issue (Fall 2009), Swords and Ploughshares, Program in Arms Control, Disarmament, and International Security (ACDIS), University of Illinois
 GLOBIO Human Impact maps Report on human impacts on the Arctic
 Krupnik, Igor, Michael A. Lang, and Scott E. Miller, eds. Smithsonian at the Poles: Contributions to International Polar Year Science. Washington, D.C.: Smithsonian Institution Scholarly Press, 2009.
 Konyshev, Valery & Sergunin, Alexander: The Arctic at the Crossroads of Geopolitical Interests Russian Politics and Law, 2012, Vol.50, No.2, pp. 34–54
 Käpylä, Juha & Mikkola, Harri: The Global Arctic: The Growing Arctic Interests of Russia, China, the United States and the European Union  FIIA Briefing Paper 133, August 2013, The Finnish Institute of International Affairs.
 Konyshev, Valery & Sergunin, Alexander. The Arctic at the crossroads of geopolitical interests // Russian Politics and Law, 2012. Vol. 50, No. 2. p. 34–54
 Konyshev, Valery & Sergunin, Alexander: Is Russia a revisionist military power in the Arctic? Defense & Security Analysis, September 2014.
 Konyshev, Valery & Sergunin, Alexander. Russia in search of its Arctic strategy: between hard and soft power? Polar Journal, April 2014.
 McCannon, John. A History of the Arctic: Nature, Exploration and Exploitation. Reaktion Books and University of Chicago Press, 2012.

External links 

 Arctic Report Card
 Blossoming Arctic
 International Arctic Research Center

 
Geography of Eastern Europe
Geography of North America
North Asia
Geography of Northeast Asia
Geography of Northern Europe
Geography of Siberia
Polar regions of the Earth